Curt Steuernagel (1886 – 30 July 1918) was a German gymnast. He competed in the men's artistic individual all-around event at the 1908 Summer Olympics. He died at Leipzig in 1918 from wounds received in action during World War I.

References

External links
 

1886 births
1918 deaths
German male artistic gymnasts
Olympic gymnasts of Germany
Gymnasts at the 1908 Summer Olympics
Place of birth missing
German military personnel killed in World War I